Gukhwa-ppang ("chrysanthemum bread") is a flower-shaped pastry stuffed with sweetened red bean paste. It is a warm street food sold throughout Korea. It is grilled in an appliance similar to a waffle iron, but with flower-shaped molds.

See also 
 Bungeo-ppang
 Gyeran-ppang
 List of pastries

References 

Korean snack food
South Korean pastries
Street food in South Korea